Henry Clarence Dworshak Jr. (August 29, 1894July 23, 1962) was a United States Senator and Congressman from Idaho. Originally from Minnesota, he was a Republican from Burley, and served over 22 years in the House and Senate.

Early years
Born in Duluth, Minnesota, Dworshak attended its local public schools and learned the printer's trade.  During the First World War, he served as a Sergeant in the U.S. Army Fourth Antiaircraft Machine Gun Battalion in the American Expeditionary Forces. After the war, Dworshak managed a printing supply business in Duluth.

He moved west in 1924 to Burley, Idaho, to become the publisher and editor of the Burley Bulletin, a semi-weekly newspaper in Cassia County. Dworshak became a public figure when he was elected president of the Idaho Editorial Association in 1931, and he was a prominent member of the American Legion and Rotary International. He was also a member of the Elks and a freemason.

Congress

House
Dworshak ran for Congress in 1936 in Idaho's 2nd district, but lost to incumbent D. Worth Clark. Two years later, Clark ran for U.S. Senator and won, and Dworshak won the open House seat in 1938 and was re-elected in 1940, 1942, and 1944.

Senate
Republican Senator John W. Thomas died in office in November 1945, and Democratic Governor Charles C. Gossett resigned to accept an appointment (by his successor) to fill the seat. Gossett failed to secure the nomination for the special election; Dworshak defeated state senator George Donart in the November 1946 election to complete the term.  Two years later, Dworshak was defeated for a full term in the 1948 general election by former state attorney general Bert H. Miller.

Miller died of a heart attack in October 1949 after only nine months in office, and Dworshak was appointed his successor by Republican Governor C. A. Robins. Dworshak won a special election in 1950, and was elected to full Senate terms in 1954 and 1960. A staunch isolationist like William Borah, Dworshak stood unwavering against overseas intervention, especially in U.S. affairs. Dworshak voted in favor of the Civil Rights Act of 1957 and the 24th Amendment to the U.S. Constitution, but did not vote on the Civil Rights Act of 1960.

Source:  ^Dworshak was appointed to the vacant seat in November 1946 and October 1949

Death
Dworshak died in office of a heart attack on July 23, 1962, in Washington, D.C. and was buried at Arlington National Cemetery. His obituary described him as "...a staunchly conservative voice on Capitol Hill..." He was succeeded by former Governor Len B. Jordan, who served until January 1973.

Legacy
 Dworshak Dam on the North Fork of the Clearwater River, near Orofino in northern Idaho
 Dworshak Elementary School in Burley

See also
 List of United States Congress members who died in office (1950–99)

References

External links

 Henry C. Dworshak, Jr., ArlingtonCemetery.net, an unofficial website

1894 births
1962 deaths
Politicians from Duluth, Minnesota
Republican Party members of the United States House of Representatives from Idaho
Republican Party United States senators from Idaho
Old Right (United States)
People from Burley, Idaho
20th-century American politicians
United States Army soldiers
United States Army personnel of World War I
Burials at Arlington National Cemetery